The Banda Linda  are a small tribe living in Central African Republic.
They are part of the Banda people, distinguished by there language called Lindá, a Central Banda language.

They are known for their typical music style, involving long wooden pipes producing a single note. The Italian composer Luciano Berio (1925–2003) defined the community as "highly musical." The French-Israeli ethnomusicologist Simha Arom has described and collected their music.

Instrument 
The pipes can be known as the Banda Linda Horns, created with tree roots hollowed out by termites. They combine to make a polyrhythm.

References 

Tribes of Africa